Nemophora polydaedala is a moth of the Adelidae family. It is found in Queensland.

Original description

External links
Australian Faunal Directory

Moths of Australia
Adelidae
Moths described in 1913